Savage Range (1938) is a Western novel, written by Luke Short. The story is set in northern New Mexico, probably in the 19th century. Jim Wade is hired by Max Bonsell to drive away the landgrabbers from the ranch. His aim is to complete the job using as little force as possible. But when his own employer frames him  for a massacre of thirteen landgrabbers, Jim Wade turns fugitive with a lynch posse at his heels. He has to keep alive to prove his innocence and get even with his former boss.

1938 American novels
Western (genre) novels
Novels by Luke Short
Novels set in New Mexico
Fiction set in the 19th century